Behind the Sun is an album by Motorpsycho, released on March 7, 2014 via Stickman Records and Rune Grammofon. It was released as a double 12" vinyl record, CD, as well as digital download. Side A of the vinyl version features two instrumental tracks, cut in parallel (the needle will randomly play one of the two songs). Since this side was marketed as featuring an "etching", these instrumentals are considered hidden tracks.
It was the second album recorded with Reine Fiske on second guitar, who joined the band for recordings and touring in 2012. It also saw the return of Ole Henrik "Ohm" Moe, who collaborated frequently with the band in the late 1990s.

Track listing
 Instrumental 1 – 3:58
 Instrumental 2 – 3:42
 Cloudwalker (a darker blue) (Sæther) – 6:06
 Ghost (Sæther) – 6:38
 On a Plate (Ryan/Sæther) – 4:09
 The Promise (Ryan/Sæther) – 4:40
 Kvæstor (incl. Where Greyhounds dare) (Kapstad/Ryan/Sæther) – 7:09
 Hell, part 4-6: Traitor/The Tapestry/Swiss Cheese Mountain (Ryan/Sæther) – 12:21
 Entropy (Sæther) – 7:23
 The Magic & The Wonder (A Love Theme) (Sæther) – 4:41
 Hell, part 7: Victim of Rock (Kapstad/Ryan/Sæther) – 7:36

Vinyl sides are as following: A: 1 & 2; B: 3-6; C: 7 & 8; D: 9-11.
CD and download version omit tracks 1 & 2.
Authors of the instrumental tracks are not mentioned on the record sleeve.

Personnel
Bent Sæther – vocals, bass, 12- & 6-string acoustic and electric guitars, Mellotrons, percussion
Hans Magnus Ryan – vocals, electric and acoustic guitars
Kenneth Kapstad – drums

with:
Reine Fiske – electric and acoustic guitars, Mellotron (present on all tracks except "The Promise")
Thomas Henriksen – piano (on "The Magic & The Wonder")
Ole Henrik Moe: saw (on "Cloudwalker"), viola (on "Ghost" and "Kvæstor")
Kari Rønnekleiv: violin (on "Ghost" and "Kvæstor")

References

 booklet of the CD and LP sleeve
 http://motorpsycho.no/discography/behind-the-sun/
 http://www.runegrammofon.com/artists/motorpsycho/motorpsycho-behind-the-sun-cd-2lp/

2014 albums
Motorpsycho albums